BeRider is the provider of shared electric scooters in the capital city of Prague, Czech Republic. The service was officially launched on September 3, 2019.

The electromobility project comes from Škoda Auto DigiLab. The service is intended for users aged 18 and over who hold a driving license of category A, A1, A2, or B. BeRider scooters are located throughout the city within the BeRider zone. Users can register and then reserve, unlock and rent them via the BeRider app.

History 
BeRider was officially launched on September 3, 2019. The project was preceded by analysis to identify how scooter sharing should work properly in Prague. Škoda Auto DigiLab worked to find eco-friendly solutions in the field of micromobility and project BeRider was able to deliver a smart mobility solution.

The pilot phase of the project ended on December 16, 2019. During those three months of operation of 150 electric scooters, more than 23,000 reservations were made. The pilot was deemed a success and the Board of Directors of Škoda Auto decided to continue the project.

The 2020 season started on March 1. At that time, the COVID-19 pandemic began in the Czech Republic. As a result, BeRider provided its electric scooters to health care professionals for more than a month completely free of charge. More than 300 doctors, nurses, and other medical staff took advantage of this offer. All other users were also able to ride for free for a week at the end of April 2020.

In June 2020, BeRider introduced a new application to simplify the use of the service. In the same month, BeRider organized its first scooter school under the guidance of a professional instructor in order to prepare users for safe driving in urban traffic.

In July 2020, BeRider launched its own online shop offering helmets, scooter gloves, discounted minute packages, scooter school vouchers, and masks with the BeRider logo.

In August 2020, BeRider launched a new service – a mountain bike rental called BeRider Bikes offering classic and electric bikes for adults and children along with accessories such as helmets, gloves, etc. A BeRider account is needed to rent a bike.

In 2017, there were 350,000 users of shared scooters worldwide and by 2019, this number had increased to 5,000,000. This increasing demand was also reflected in the Czech market and BeRider thus expanded its fleet in August 2020. Due to the increasing popularity, BeRider was also able to maintain its service over the winter period.

Usage 
The use of BeRider electric scooters is subject to age of majority, the possession of a driving license of category A, A1, A2, or B, and the ownership of a smartphone with the BeRider app downloaded. To register for an account, users must provide their contact details, photos of their ID and driving license, and payment card details. After their account is approved, which can take up to 24 hours, the user is given 15 free minutes and can start riding.

A map in the app provides the precise locations for each individual scooter. Once an available scooter is reached, the user can unlock it by pressing a button in the app. The user can then also access the tailbox which provides helmets in two sizes.

The ride can be finished only in the BeRider zone which is marked with gray in the user application. If the user wants to stop outside of the zone, they have the option to pause the ride. After parking, the user returns the helmet back to the tailbox, puts the scooter back on the stand, and finishes the ride in the app.

The first minute of every ride is free. Each additional minute costs 5 CZK in the regular fare cost. The user has an option to purchase a discounted package of prepaid minutes in the app, which reduces the price to 2.9 CZK per minute. After the ride is completed, the price is deducted from the user's payment card or the minutes are deducted from the prepaid package.

Technical parameters

References 

Scooter sharing
Scooter sharing companies
Micromobility
Electric scooters